"Dope Nose" is a song by American rock band Weezer. It is the first single off the band's fourth album, Maladroit. It was officially released in March 2002, though it had been performed live and in the studio during the band's 2000 summer tour comeback after hiatus.

Frontman Rivers Cuomo wrote the song on the same night he wrote "Hash Pipe", after drinking three shots of tequila and a Ritalin.
"Dope Nose" is one of the songs playable in the PlayStation 2 video game Amplitude, developed by Harmonix. An interview in Electronic Gaming Monthly with the creators of the PlayStation 2 game Guitar Hero (also developed by Harmonix) mentioned the game's early builds were based on "Dope Nose". The song also appears in an episode of Monk, "Mr. Monk Goes to a Fashion Show", the Psych episode, "Romeo and Juliet and Juliet", and as a playable track in Guitar Hero: Van Halen. During various live shows, Weezer bassist Scott Shriner sometimes performs lead vocals on the song.

Music video
Director Michel Gondry wrote a treatment for a "Dope Nose" music video. The video would feature the members of Weezer playing a game of soccer against a Mexican heavy metal band. Though the band rejected the treatment, it is still available in written form on Gondry's Directors Label DVD.

The song's official music video was directed by Marcos Siega and features the Japanese motorcycle gang culture of Bōsōzoku.

Track listing
Radio Only Promo CD
"Dope Nose" - 2:17

Charts

Notes

External links
Lyrics for "Dope Nose"

Weezer songs
2002 songs
2002 singles
Songs written by Rivers Cuomo
Music videos directed by Marcos Siega
Songs about cannabis